As a form of transcription, direct or quoted speech is spoken or written text that reports speech or thought in its original form phrased by the original speaker. In narrative, it is usually enclosed in quotation marks, but it can be enclosed in guillemets (« ») in some languages.  The cited speaker either is mentioned in the tag (or attribution) or is implied.

Comparison between direct, indirect, and free indirect speech
 Quoted or direct speech:

He laid down his bundle and thought of his misfortune. "And just what pleasure have I found since I came into this world?" he asked.
 Reported or normal indirect speech:

He laid down his bundle and thought of his misfortune. He asked himself what pleasure he had found since he came into the world.
 Free indirect speech:
He laid down his bundle and thought of his misfortune. And just what pleasure had he found since he came into this world?

A crucial semantic distinction between direct and indirect speech is that direct speech purports to report the exact words that were said or written, whereas indirect speech is a representation of speech in one's own words.

The distinction between indirect speech and free indirect speech is mostly one of style, hence free indirect speech is sometimes described as a free indirect style.

Notes

See also
 Quotation marks in English
 Third-person narrative

References

Semantics
Semantic units
Syntactic entities